Ulderico Sergo (Fiume, 4 July 1913 – Cleveland, 20 February 1967) was a bantamweight professional boxer from Italy, who won the gold medal at the 1936 Summer Olympics in Berlin. He defeated Jackie Wilson of the United States by decision in the final. He was part of the Italian team which won the international boxing event at Yankee Stadium on 9 June 1937.

Olympic results 
Below are the results of Ulderico Sergo, an Italian bantamweight boxer, who competed at the 1936 Berlin Olympics:

 Round of 32: bye
 Round of 16: defeated Frigyes Kubinyi (Hungary) on points
 Quarterfinal: defeated Joseph Cornelis (Belgium) on points
 Semifinal: defeated Stig Cederberg (Sweden) on points
 Final: defeated Jackie Wilson (United States) on points (won gold medal)

References

External links
Olympic profile

1913 births
1967 deaths
Olympic boxers of Italy
Bantamweight boxers
Olympic gold medalists for Italy
Boxers at the 1936 Summer Olympics
People from Rijeka
Sportspeople from Rijeka
Olympic medalists in boxing
Medalists at the 1936 Summer Olympics
Italian emigrants to the United States
Italian male boxers